The Arraiolos Group is an informal meeting of Presidents of parliamentary and semi-presidential European Union member states, held roughly once in a year. A political forum for the heads of state of parliamentary republics and also some semi-presidential republics (as opposed to constitutional monarchies or countries governed by a presidential system) whose role, according to the respective constitutions, may range from being significantly executive to largely ceremonial. It deals with questions and problems concerning the current state and future development of the EU as well as how to approach the challenges of globalisation.

The name is derived from the small Portuguese town of Arraiolos, where the first meeting took place in 2003. Jorge Sampaio, then the President of Portugal, had invited the presidents of Finland, Germany, as well as of soon-to-be EU members Hungary, Latvia and Poland to discuss the consequences of the 2004 enlargement of the European Union and plans for a Constitution for Europe.

Following the 2005 meeting, the seven participating presidents wrote a joint article titled "Together for Europe" about their conception of the European community. It was published on 15 July 2005 by Diena, Frankfurter Allgemeine Zeitung, Gazeta Wyborcza, Público, Helsingin Sanomat, la Repubblica and Der Standard, leading newspapers of the respective countries.

The 14th meeting of the heads of state of the Arraiolos Group was held in Riga, Latvia in 2018. The 15th meeting was held in Athens, Greece in October 2019. The 16th meeting was held in Rome on 15 September 2021.

Meetings

References

European Union
21st-century diplomatic conferences (Europe)